Datis nuperrime is an encyclical of Pope Pius XII dated 5 November 1956 concerning the Soviet invasion of Hungary to suppress the Hungarian Revolution of 1956. This is a second encyclical protesting the oppression of the Hungarian people. Pope Pius, as in his previous protests, does not mention the Soviet Union by name.

Quotations from the Encyclical 
 But tidings have reached Us lately, which fill Our heart with pain and sorrow. There is being shed again in the cities, towns, and villages of Hungary,  the blood of citizens, who long with all their hearts for their rightful freedom. National institutions which had just been restored, have been overthrown again and violently destroyed. A blood-drenched people has been reduced once more to slavery by the armed might of foreigners.
 We cannot help but deplore and condemn,  for so Our consciousness of Our office bids Us, these unhappy events which fill all Catholics and all free peoples with deepest sorrow and indignation. May those whose commands have caused these tragic events, come to realize that the rightful freedom of a people cannot be extinguished by the shedding of human blood.
 We, who watch over all peoples with a father's concern, assert that any violence and any bloodshed which anyone unjustly causes, can  never be tolerated. On the contrary, We exhort all people and all classes of society to a peace, which finds its basis in justice, liberty, and love

References

External link 

 Datis nuperrine

Encyclicals of Pope Pius XII
Hungarian Revolution of 1956
Persecution of Catholics during the pontificate of Pope Pius XII
Catholic Church in Hungary
Holy See–Soviet Union relations
1956 in Christianity
1956 documents